There have been five Popes Celestine of the Roman Catholic Church:
 Pope Celestine I (422–432)
 Antipope Celestine II (1124)
 Pope Celestine II (1143–1144)
 Pope Celestine III (1191–1198)
 Pope Celestine IV (1241)
 Pope Celestine V (1294)

Celestine